Hanae (written: ,  ,  or ) is a feminine Japanese given name. Notable people with the name include:
, Japanese athlete
, Japanese swimmer
, Japanese actress
, Japanese ice hockey player
, Japanese fashion designer
, Japanese women's footballer
, Japanese figure skater
Hanae (singer) (born 1994), Japanese singer

Hanae (written: 花江) is also a Japanese surname. Notable people with the surname include:
, Japanese voice actor

Japanese feminine given names
Japanese-language surnames